An assault rifle is a rifle that uses an intermediate cartridge, a detachable magazine, and can switch between semi-automatic/fully automatic fire. Assault rifles are currently the standard service rifles in most modern armies. Some rifles listed below such as the AR15 also come in semi-auto models which would not belong under the term "Assault Rifle".

Definition
By strict definition, a firearm must have the following characteristics to be considered an assault rifle:

 It must be an individual weapon;
 It must be capable of selective fire, which means it has the capacity to switch between semi-automatic and burst/fully automatic fire;
 It must have an intermediate-power cartridge: more power than a pistol but less than a standard rifle or battle rifle. For full-power automatic rifles, see List of battle rifles;
 Its ammunition must be supplied from a detachable box magazine;
 It should have an effective range of at least .

Rifles that meet most of these criteria, but not all, are technically not assault rifles, despite frequently being called such.

For example:
 Select-fire M2 carbines and Amogh carbines are not assault rifles; their effective range is only 200 yards.
 Select-fire rifles such as the FN FAL are not assault rifles; they are battle rifles and fire full-powered rifle cartridges.
 Semi-automatic-only rifles like the Colt AR-15 are not assault rifles; they do not have select-fire capabilities. In contrast, the original ArmaLite AR-15 would meet the criteria.
 Semi-automatic-only rifles with fixed magazines like the SKS are not assault rifles; they do not have detachable box magazines and are not capable of automatic fire.

Several of the rifles on the below list have non-assault rifle variants. Because they lack the selective fire capability as they only fire semi-automatic even though it fulfils the other requirements of the definition above.

List

See also
 List of battle rifles
List of bolt-action rifles
List of carbines
 List of grenade launchers
 List of machine guns
 List of multiple-barrel firearms
 List of pistols
 List of pump-action rifles
 List of revolvers
 List of semi-automatic pistols
 List of semi-automatic rifles
 List of sniper rifles
List of straight-pull rifles
 Service rifle

References

Assault rifles
 List